Tinkercad is a free-of-charge, online 3D modeling program that runs in a web browser. Since it became available in 2011 it has become a popular platform for creating models for 3D printing as well as an entry-level introduction to constructive solid geometry in schools.

History
Tinkercad was founded by former Google engineer Kai Backman and his cofounder Mikko Mononen, with a goal to make 3D modeling, especially the design of physical items, accessible to the general public, and allow users to publish their designs under a Creative Commons license. In 2011, the tinkercad.com website was launched as a web-based 3D modeling tool for WebGL-enabled browsers, and in 2012 the company moved its headquarters to San Francisco. By 2012, over 100,000 3D designs had been published by users.

In May 2013, Autodesk announced at a Maker Faire that they would acquire Tinkercad.

In March 2017, Autodesk recommended users of the soon-to-be-retired 123D Sculpt migrate to Tinkercad (or Maya LT). In May, Autodesk discontinued its 123D Circuits (Circuits.io) "Electronics Lab". The program's features were merged into Tinkercad.

Concept

Tinkercad uses a simplified constructive solid geometry method of constructing models. A design is made up of primitive shapes that are either "solid" or "hole". Combining solids and holes together, new shapes can be created, which in turn can be assigned the property of solid or hole. In addition to the standard library of primitive shapes, a user can create custom shape generators using a built-in JavaScript editor.

File formats 
Shapes can be imported in three formats: STL and OBJ for 3D, and 2-dimensional SVG shapes for extruding into 3D shapes. Tinkercad exports models in STL or OBJ formats, ready for 3D printing.

Tinkercad also includes a feature to export 3D models to Minecraft Java Edition, and also offers the ability to design structures using Lego bricks.

Circuits

The Circuits section of Tinkercad is a simulator for an electronic circuit with a Arduino Uno or a Micro Bit board or a ATtiny chip in the browser. The code can be made with CodeBlocks which are graphical code pieces that can be put together by shifting them with the mouse cursor. Programming with code text is also possible.
Digi-Key wrote an article in 2022 about Tinkercad how to start with Tinkercad. They call Tinkercad "intuitive".
A circuit can be built with components, but there are "Starters" which are complete circuits with code.

Tinkercad has included libraries for some components, such as the Adafruit Neopixel library, the Arduino Servo library and a library for a I2C display. It is not possible to select or upload other libraries.
The circuit can have analog components which are fully simulated.

Although Tinkercad is an easy introduction into programming and electronics, it has features for advanced users:
 Multiple boards can be simulated at the same time. For example, two Arduino boards communicating with each other.
 The analog circuit can be very complex.

See also
 Comparison of computer-aided design software

References

External links
 

Autodesk products
3D graphics software
Computer-aided design software
Freeware 3D graphics software